The Centre for Military Airworthiness & Certification (CEMILAC) is a laboratory of the Indian Defence Research and Development Organisation (DRDO). Located in Bangalore, its primary function is certification and qualification of military aircraft and airborne systems. Some of its achievements are issuance of IOC for LCA, ALH.Clearance for Bio-ATF for AN-32. It has 14 regional centres located across the country.

References

External links

Defence Research and Development Organisation laboratories
Research institutes in Bangalore
1995 establishments in Karnataka
Research institutes established in 1995